Gertrude Baillie-Weaver (8 June 1855 – 26 November 1926) was an English suffragette and writer who published as Gertrude Colmore. She co-founded the National Council for Animals' Welfare and wrote in support of animal and human rights. Her books about Suffragette Sally and Emily Wilding Davison were republished in the 1980s.

Personal life
Baillie-Weaver was born Gertrude Renton on 8 June 1855 in Kensington, London. Her parents were Elizabeth (née Leishman) and John Thomas Renton, a stockbroker. She had five older sisters. 

She married lawyer Henry Arthur Colmore Dunn. After his death, when she was in her forties, she married the feminist Harold Baillie-Weaver, who was a barrister and a theosophist. He was an advocate for human and animal rights.

Writing and activism 
Baillie-Weaver wrote under the name Gertrude Colmore. She published poetry, short stories and novels in support of theosophy and women's suffrage and against vivisection and physiology.

In 1907 she published The Angel and the Outcast, a melodramatic novel in support of animal rights. The following year she published Priests of Progress with the same theme. This book was so successful in putting forward an anti-vivisection message that physiologists had meetings to decide how they could counter her campaign. She served on the committee that managed Battersea General Hospital which was notably opposed to any experimentation using either animals or humans. In 1912 she called for animals to be included in the Geneva Convention in a pamphlet she co-wrote for the Humanitarian League.

She supported women's suffrage by writing short stories for Votes for Women and The Suffragette newspapers. She chaired the suffrage group in Saffron Waldon. She was an early member of the Women's Freedom League and her husband spoke for the Men's League for Women's Suffrage. In 1911, as the campaign for women's suffrage became increasingly militant, she published Suffragette Sally, a fictional account that included references to real people. 

Emily Wilding Davison was a militant suffragette who died in 1913 when she was run over by the King's racehorse during a protest at Epsom. Baillie-Weaver wrote a long obituary. It was later published as The Life of Emily Davison. The following year her work Mr Jones and the Governess was published by the Women's Freedom League.

In 1926 she published A Brother of the Shadow which returned to the themes of The Angel and the Outcast and Priests of Progress. The villain is a professor of physiology who uses mind-control to make people kill themselves.

Legacy 
Baillie-Weaver died in Wimbledon in November 1926. 

She and her husband were commemorated with a statue in St John's Lodge public gardens in Regent's Park, London erected in 1931. The statue by Charles Leonard Hartwell celebrates their work and the National Council for Animals' Welfare which they founded. It shows a woman "Protecting the Defenceless" and is known as The Shepherdess or The Goatherd's Daughter.

References

1855 births
1926 deaths
People from Kensington
British suffragists
Anti-vivisectionists